Joseph Gustave Ernest Allard (2 April 1840 - 7 August 1878) was a Belgian politician. He was a member of the Chamber of Representatives.

References
 earl GOBLET D'ALVIELLA, Ernest Allard, from: Revue de Belgique, 1878.
 Albert VAN DER LINDEN, Joseph Gustave Ernest Allard, in: Biographie nationale de Belgique, T. XXIX, Brussel, 1956.
 Jean-Luc DE PAEPE & Christiane RAINDORF-GERARD (red), Le Parlement Belge 1831-1894. Données Biographiques, Brussel, Académie Royale de Belgique, 1996

Members of the Chamber of Representatives (Belgium)
1840 births
1878 deaths